Count Pavel Alexandrovich Stroganov (born June 7 (18), 1774, in Paris; died June 10 (22), 1817) was a Russian military commander and statesman, Lieutenant General, Adjutant General to Alexander I of Russia.  He took part in the Privy Committee that outlined Government reform of Alexander I.

Marriage and issue
He married Sophie Golitysn, daughter of Vladimir Borisovich Golitsyn and his wife Natalya Petrovna on 6 May 1793. They had five children:
Alexandre Pavlovitch Stroganov (1794-1814)
Natalia Pavlovna Stroganova (1796-1872), sole heir to the Stroganov estates, married her cousin count Sergei Grigoryevich Stroganov (1794-1882) in 1818.
Adelaïda Pavlovna Stroganova (1799-1882), lady in waiting, member of the Order of St Catherine, married prince Vassili Sergueïevitch Golitsyn (1794-1836) in 1821, inherited Marino Castle from her mother in 1845
Elizaveta Pavlovna Stroganova (1802-1863), married prince Ivan Dmitrievitch Saltykov (1797-1832).
Olga Pavlovna Stroganova (1808-1837), married count Pavel Karlovitch Fersen (1800-1884).

See also
Alexander Sergeyevich Stroganov

References

1774 births
1817 deaths
Russian commanders of the Napoleonic Wars
Pavel Alexandrovich
Recipients of the Order of St. George of the Second Degree
Recipients of the Order of St. George of the Third Degree
Burials at Lazarevskoe Cemetery (Saint Petersburg)
Ambassadors of the Russian Empire to the United Kingdom